Désirée, Desiree or Desirée (with other variations possible)  is a female given name. It originates from the French word , meaning desired. The Puritans used the name Desire as a given name for females. The male form is Désiré.

Notable people
 Désirée Artôt (1835–1907), Belgian soprano
 Desirae Brown, member of The 5 Browns
 Desiree Burch (born 1979), American comedian 
 Désirée Clary (1777–1860), Queen Desideria of Sweden and Norway
 Desireé Cousteau (born 1956), an American porn actress
 Desiree del Valle, Philippine-American actress
 Desirée Goyette, American singer
 Desiree Gould (1945–2021), American actress
 Desiree Hartsock, The Bachelorette of 2013
 Desiree Heslop (born 1961), a British singer also known by the stage name Princess
 Desiree Horton (born 1971, nickname: "Chopper Chick"), a Los Angeles helicopter pilot and TV reporter
 Désirée Le Beau (1907-1993), Austro-Hungarian-American industrial chemist
 Desiree Lim (born 1971), Malaysian-born Canadian independent film director, producer, and screenwriter
 Desiree Lowry, director of Miss Universe Puerto Rico, former Miss Puerto Rico 1995 and 4th runner-up at Miss Universe 1995
 Désirée Miloshevic, Internet public servant
 Désirée Nosbusch (born 1965), Luxembourgian actress
 Desirée Rogers (born 1959), White House Social Secretary
 Princess Désirée, Baroness Silfverschiöld (born 1938), a sister of the King of Sweden
 Desirée Sparre-Enger (born 1976), Norwegian bubblegum dance singer also known by the stage name Bambee
 Désirée Talbot (born 1926), South African opera singer
 Désirée van der Walt (born 1956), South African politician
 Desiree van Lunteren, Dutch footballer
 Desiree Washington (born 1973), American beauty pageant contestant
 Desi-Rae Young (born 2002), American basketball player
 Desirée Annette Weekes (born 1968), English pop singer known by the stage name Des'ree

References

Feminine given names